Arnold of Lübeck (died 1211–1214) was a Benedictine abbot, a chronicler, the author of the Chronica Slavorum and advocate of the papal cause in the Hohenstaufen conflict. He was a monk at St. Ägidien monastery in Braunschweig, then from 1177 the first abbot of the newly founded St. John's monastery in Lübeck.

References

German chroniclers
Clergy from Lübeck
13th-century German Roman Catholic priests
13th-century deaths
Benedictine abbots
Year of birth unknown
German male non-fiction writers
13th-century Latin writers
13th-century German writers
13th-century German historians
People from Braunschweig
Writers from Lübeck